{{Infobox football club season
| club               = FC Zenit Saint Petersburg
| image              = 
| caption            = 
| season             = 2004
| manager            = Vlastimil Petržela
| chairman           = 
| stadium            = Petrovsky Stadium
| league             = 
| league result      = 
| cup1               = 
| cup1 result        = {{nowrap|Round of 16 vs Krylia Sovetov}}
| cup2               = 
| cup2 result        = 
| cup3               = 
| cup3 result        = 
| league topscorer   = Aleksandr Kerzhakov (18)
| season topscorer   = Aleksandr Kerzhakov (29)
| highest attendance = 
| lowest attendance  = 
| average attendance = 
| prevseason         = 2003
| nextseason         = 2005
}}
The 2004 Zenit St.Petersburg season' was the club's tenth season in the Russian Premier League, the highest tier of association football in Russia.

Squad

Transfers

In

Out

Competitions
Overall record

Premier League

Results by round

Results

Table

Russian Cup
2003/04

2004/05Round 16 took place during the 2005 season.

UEFA Cup

Qualifying rounds

First round

Group stage

Squad statistics

Appearances and goals

|-
|colspan="14"|Players who left Zenit during the season:''

|}

Goal scorers

Clean sheets

Disciplinary record

References

FC Zenit Saint Petersburg seasons
Zenit St.Petersburg